El Guapo is a town in Páez Municipality, Miranda State, Venezuela.

Populated places in Miranda (state)